The Sangro is a river in eastern central Italy, known in ancient times as Sagrus from the Greek Sagros or Isagros, Ισαγρος.

It rises in the middle of Abruzzo National Park near Pescasseroli in the Apennine Mountains. It flows southeast past Pescasseroli, Opi and Villetta Barrea and flows into the artificial lake Lago di Barrea. It then flows northeast through Alfedena, Castel di Sangro, Ateleta, Quadri, and Villa Santa Maria, before flowing into the Lago di Bomba. From there it flows northeast , it is joined by the Aventino, and thence it flows into the Adriatic Sea south of Punta Cavalluccio.

During World War II, the mouth of the Sangro was part of the series of German military fortifications known as the Gustav Line. The Eighth Army crossed the Sangro on 23 November 1943. This crossing was the beginning of the Allied offensive on the Winter Line defenses east of the Apennines, which petered out in mid-December having failed to secure vital cities such as Orsogna.

See also
 Winter Line

Rivers of Abruzzo
Rivers of the Apennines
Adriatic Italian coast basins
Rivers of the Province of L'Aquila
Rivers of the Province of Chieti
Rivers of the Province of Isernia
Rivers of Italy